Sociedad Deportiva Oyonesa is a Spanish football team based in Oyón, Álava in the Basque Country. Founded in 1928, it plays in 3ª - Group 16. Its stadium is Estadio Luis Asarta with a capacity of 1,500 seats.

Season to season

13 seasons in Tercera División

References

External links
Futbolme team profile  
SD Oyonesa on Ayuntamiento de Oyón-Oion 

Football clubs in the Basque Country (autonomous community)
Association football clubs established in 1928
1928 establishments in Spain